Henry "Harry" Schaaf was an American track and field athlete, a member of the Irish American Athletic Club, and a Police Officer in the New York City Police Department. He served as a patrolman from 1912 until his retirement in 1943.

On April 9, 1911, Schaaf was a member of the Irish American Athletic Club 4x440 yard relay team that broke the world record at Celtic Park, Queens, New York, and set the first IAAF- recognized world's record for 4x440 yard or 4x400 meter relay race, with a time of 3 minutes and 18.2 seconds. The other members of the world's record setting team were; Harry Gissing, Mel Sheppard and James Rosenberger.

Notes

External links
Archives of Irish America - NYU
Winged Fist Organization

Year of birth missing
Year of death missing
American male sprinters
World record setters in athletics (track and field)
New York City Police Department officers
Track and field athletes from New York City